Rafael A. Fernandez Reyes (born August 3, 1988) is an Dominican professional baseball coach. He is the batting practice pitcher for the New York Mets of Major League Baseball (MLB).

Career

Playing career
Fernandez began his professional playing career in the Mets farm system signed as an undrafted free agent playing for seven years as an outfielder beginning in 2006 with the Dominican Summer League Mets. In 2007 with the Gulf Coast League Mets, 2008 for the Kingsport Mets and the Brooklyn Cyclones, 2009 for the Savannah Sand Gnats, 2010 for the Gnats and the St. Lucie Mets, 2011 for St. Lucie before being demoted back to the Gnats. In 2012, he was promoted to the Binghamton Mets before being demoted once again to St. Lucie. His playing career ended after spending two winter seasons with the Gigantes del Cibao for the 2012-2013 season and the Estrellas de Oriente for 2013-2014 of the Dominican Winter League.

Coaching career
Fernandez began his coaching career in the Mets minor league system as an outfield coach in May 2015 before being promoted to hitting coach in November 2015. In 2016 he was named the hitting coach for the Dominican Summer League Mets 2.
From 2017 to 2018, he was the hitting coach for the Gulf Coast Mets. In 2019, Fernandez was hired as the hitting coach for the Kingsport Mets. In 2020, he was named the hitting coach for the Brooklyn Cyclones. In 2021, Fernandez was promoted to the Mets coaching staff as the batting practice pitcher replacing Ender Chávez.

References

External links

 LinkedIn

1988 births
Living people
People from Hermanas Mirabal Province
Dominican Summer League Mets players
Gulf Coast Mets players
Kingsport Mets players
Brooklyn Cyclones players
Savannah Sand Gnats players
St. Lucie Mets players
Binghamton Mets players
Gigantes del Cibao players
Estrellas Orientales players
Minor league baseball coaches
New York Mets coaches